Political Science is a social science dealing with politics and systems of government.

Political Science, political studies, or political analysis may also refer to:

Political Science (journal), an academic journal
Political Studies, an academic journal
Political Analysis (journal), an academic journal
"Political Science" (song), a 1972 song by Randy Newman

See also
 Politicization of science
 Politics (disambiguation)
 Science (disambiguation)
 Poli sci (disambiguation)